Galtara aurivilii is a moth of the  subfamily Arctiinae. It was described by Arnold Pagenstecher in 1901. It is found in Cameroon, Kenya, Malawi, Rwanda, Uganda and Zambia.

References

 Natural History Museum Lepidoptera generic names catalog

Nyctemerina
Moths described in 1901
Moths of Africa